Felicia Minei Behr is an American television producer and network executive who has worked on three daytime serials. She helped launch All My Children and won 2 Emmys for Best Drama Series as Executive Producer of the show, in 1992 and 1994.

Career: Executive Producer
Felicia Minei Behr is one of the pioneers of Daytime television, helping to launch All My Children. As the first female Daytime television producer, she joined the show as an associate producer in 1970.

Her career spanned 3 decades, spending a majority of it as Executive Producer of “All My Children”, winning the show its first Daytime Emmy Award for “Best Drama Series” in 1992 and a second in 1994, with 9 nominations over her tenure.

Minei Behr’s seven-year tenure as Executive Producer on “All My Children” is hailed by many fans as the golden age for the show. During her tenure as EP, the show drew critical acclaim and was a consistent #2 in the ratings in the first half of the 1990s.

Minei Behr grew up on Long Island, in a modest Italian family. Without the means for college, Minei Behr attended the Katharine Gibbs secretarial school in New York City. Her first job in television was at CBS as a secretary in 1960. During a time when women were not allowed to hold high-ranking positions in television, from there, she worked her way up to various positions on several shows including The Jackie Gleason Show, The Ed Sullivan Show, and The Garry Moore Show, before helping to launch “All My Children.”

In addition to “All My Children”, Felicia Minei Behr served as Executive Producer on Ryan’s Hope and As the World Turns.

From 2000 to 2004, she served as Senior Vice President of ABC Daytime, overseeing production of all of the ABC soaps and The View.

Positions held
All My Children
Executive Producer (February 1989 - April 1996) 
Associate Producer (1970–1975)

Ryan's Hope
Executive Producer (1988–1989)
Producer (1982–1988)

As the World Turns
Executive Producer (December 1996 - July 1999)

ABC Daytime 
Senior Vice President (May 2000 - May 2004)

Awards and nominations
Daytime Emmy Awards

NOMINATIONS: 9 Noms -(1990–1997; Best Drama Series; All My Children)

WINS: 2 WINS -(1992 & 1994; Best Drama Series; All My Children)

People's Choice Award - win  (1995)

External links
 ABC Daytime

Soap opera producers
Living people
Year of birth missing (living people)